Qərvənd or Karvend may refer to the following villages in Azerbaijan:

 Qərvənd, Agdam
 Qərvənd, Fizuli
 Xan Qərvənd

See also
 Garvand (disambiguation)
 Garavand (disambiguation)